Dana Bruce Barros (born April 13, 1967) is an American former professional basketball player from the National Basketball Association (NBA). In college, he played at Boston College, finishing as one of the school's all-time leading scorers. He was the head men's basketball coach at Newbury College in Massachusetts. He is now the owner of AAU Basketball organization, the "Dana Barros Gladiators", based in Avon, Massachusetts, and now Stoughton, Massachusetts. He is of Cape Verdean descent.

High school career

Barros was a four-year basketball starter at Xaverian Brothers High School in Westwood, Massachusetts where he tallied 1,821 points, including a record 57 points in a tournament game versus Needham. The 1985 Catholic Conference MVP and Boston Globe All Scholastic averaged over 30 points per game during his senior campaign in an era before the 3-point shot was implemented. He is now in the Xaverian Brothers High School "Hall of Fame".

College career
Barros played college basketball for Boston College. On February 25, 2017, Barros' number 3 was retired at Boston College.

Professional career
The 5' 11" (1.80 m), 165 lb (75 kg) point guard, began his professional career in 1989 when he was selected in the first round of the NBA draft by the Seattle SuperSonics with the 16th pick. Most of his time spent in Seattle was as a backup to point guard Gary Payton, who was considered to be a much more competent ball handler and defender, as Barros was deemed more usable at shooting guard.

Prior to the 1993–94 season, the Sonics traded Barros to the Charlotte Hornets in exchange for Kendall Gill. Two days later, Charlotte traded Barros, Sidney Green, and their 1993 draft choice, Greg Graham, to the Philadelphia 76ers for Hersey Hawkins.

In Philadelphia, Barros received much more playing time (31 minutes per game) with the Sixers, than when he was with the Western Conference SuperSonics (18 minutes per game). This allowed him to improve his scoring output the previous season with Seattle from 7.8 to 13.3 points per game. He was the last Sixer to wear #3 for the team, prior to the arrival of Allen Iverson.

In Barros' second season with the Sixers (1994–95) he achieved career highs in minutes per game (40.5), field goal percentage (49.0%), three-point percentage (46.4%), scoring average (20.6 points per contest), rebounding (3.3 per game) and assists (7.5) while playing all 82 regular season games. Highlights included a 50-point, 8-rebound performance against the Houston Rockets in March 1995, and a 25-point, 10-rebound, 15-assist triple-double effort against the Orlando Magic a few weeks later. Barros was selected to play in the 1995 NBA All-Star Game and at season's end was voted the league's Most Improved Player. He also set an NBA record by making at least one three-pointer in 89 consecutive games from December 23, 1994 until January 10, 1996. This record was broken by Kyle Korver in December 2013. Barros appeared four consecutive times at the AT&T Long Distance Shootout during the All-Star Weekend from 1992 to 1996, coming in second twice.

Barros became a free agent at the end of the 1994-95 NBA season. He signed with his hometown Boston Celtics, and remained for five seasons as a role player alongside David Wesley and Dee Brown and mentor to younger players such as Antoine Walker and Paul Pierce.

In the offseason of 2000, Barros was traded to the Dallas Mavericks as part of a four-team deal that also involved the Utah Jazz and Golden State Warriors. By the time the 2000–01 season had commenced, the Mavs had traded Barros to the Detroit Pistons, where he played 89 games over two seasons, averaging 7.5 points per game, until waiving him in 2002.

After that, he was out of the NBA for almost two years, before rejoining the Celtics towards the end of the 2003–04 regular season, first as an assistant coach and later as a player. He scored six points in one final game. He retired from the league with career averages of 10.5 points, 1.9 rebounds, 3.3 assists and a career three-point average of 41.1%.

Post-basketball Life
After retiring from basketball, Barros opened the Dana Barros Sports Complex, a sports and social club in Mansfield, Massachusetts. However, the project proved more costly than Barros expected. He incurred massive debts. Causing him to leave the project. But in 2018, He opened a new Basketball Club and Sports Complex, in Stoughton, Massachusetts, which has done much better than the first time he opened a Sports Complex. The current Sports Complex and Basketball Club in Stoughton has 5 basketball courts and hosts, AAU games, Tournaments, and Basketball Camps.

For two months in 2006, Barros worked as an assistant coach for the Northeastern University men's basketball team, a position from which he resigned in June 2006 to accept a role as the Director of Recreation for the city of Boston.

Barros is now with the media relations department for the Celtics.

Barros serves as a "basketball insider" for New England Sports Network (NESN) and offers analysis and insight on the NBA on the show NESN Daily.

In media

Barros also appeared on the album titled B-Ball's Best Kept Secret, a 1994 album featuring tracks of an array of early 1990s NBA players. He is featured on a song called "Check It". He is also featured with fellow NBA All-Star Cedric Ceballos and rappers Grand Puba, Sadat X, AG and Diamond D on a song "Ya Don't Stop".

Personal life
Barros has one son, Jordan Barros.

Career statistics

Regular season

|-
| style="text-align:left;"| 1989–90
| style="text-align:left;"| Seattle
| 81 || 25 || 20.1 || .405 || .399 || .809 || 1.6 || 2.5 || 0.7 || 0.0 || 9.7
|-
| style="text-align:left;"| 1990–91
| style="text-align:left;"| Seattle
| 66 || 0 || 11.4 || .495 || .395 || .918 || 1.1 || 1.7 || 0.3 || 0.0 || 6.3
|-
| style="text-align:left;"| 1991–92
| style="text-align:left;"| Seattle
| 75 || 1 || 17.7 || .483 || .446 || .759 || 1.1 || 1.7 || 0.7 || 0.1 || 8.3
|-
| style="text-align:left;"| 1992–93
| style="text-align:left;"| Seattle
| 69 || 2 || 18.0 || .451 || .379 || .831 || 1.6 || 2.2 || 0.9 || 0.0 || 7.8
|-
| style="text-align:left;"| 1993–94
| style="text-align:left;"| Philadelphia
| 81 || 70 || 31.1 || .469 || .381 || .800 || 2.4 || 5.2 || 1.3 || 0.1 || 13.3
|-
| style="text-align:left;"| 1994–95
| style="text-align:left;"| Philadelphia
| 82 || 82 || 40.5 || .490 || .464 || .899 || 3.3 || 7.5 || 1.8 || 0.0 || 20.6
|-
| style="text-align:left;"| 1995–96
| style="text-align:left;"| Boston
| 80 || 25 || 29.1 || .470 || .408 || .884 || 2.4 || 3.8 || 0.7 || 0.0 || 13.0
|-
| style="text-align:left;"| 1996–97
| style="text-align:left;"| Boston
| 24 || 8 || 29.5 || .435 || .410 || .860 || 2.0 || 3.4 || 1.1 || 0.3 || 12.5
|-
| style="text-align:left;"| 1997–98
| style="text-align:left;"| Boston
| 80 || 15 || 21.1 || .461 || .407 || .847 || 1.9 || 3.6 || 1.0 || 0.1 || 9.8
|-
| style="text-align:left;"| 1998–99
| style="text-align:left;"| Boston
| 50 || 16 || 23.1 || .453 || .400 || .877 || 2.1 || 4.2 || 1.0 || 0.1 || 9.3
|-
| style="text-align:left;"| 1999–00
| style="text-align:left;"| Boston
| 72 || 0 || 15.8 || .451 || .410 || .866 || 1.4 || 1.8 || 0.4 || 0.1 || 7.2
|-
| style="text-align:left;"| 2000–01
| style="text-align:left;"| Detroit
| 60 || 0 || 18.0 || .444 || .419 || .850 || 1.6 || 1.8 || 0.5 || 0.0 || 8.0
|-
| style="text-align:left;"| 2001–02
| style="text-align:left;"| Detroit
| 29 || 20 || 20.1 || .385 || .338 || .778 || 2.0 || 2.7 || 0.5 || 0.1 || 6.7
|-
| style="text-align:left;"| 2003–04
| style="text-align:left;"| Boston
| 1 || 0 || 11.0 || .667 || .000 || 1.000 || 0.0 || 0.0 || 0.0 || 0.0 || 6.0
|- class="sortbottom"
| style="text-align:center;" colspan="2"| Career
| 850 || 264 || 22.9 || .460 || .411 || .858 || 1.9 || 3.3 || 0.9 || 0.1 || 10.5
|- class="sortbottom"
| style="text-align:center;" colspan="2"| All-Star
| 1 || 0 || 11.0 || .400 || .333 || .000 || 1.0 || 3.0 || 0.0 || 0.0 || 5.0

Playoffs

|-
|style="text-align:left;"|1991
|style="text-align:left;”|Seattle
|3||0||8.3||.692||.400||.750||1.3||1.7||1.0||0.0||7.7
|-
|style="text-align:left;"|1992
|style="text-align:left;”|Seattle
|7||0||13.7||.525||.588||–||1.0||1.1||0.6||0.0||7.4
|-
|style="text-align:left;"|1993
|style="text-align:left;”|Seattle
|16||0||8.5||.468||.313||.750||0.8||0.8||0.3||0.0||3.4
|-
|style="text-align:left;"|2002
|style="text-align:left;”|Detroit
|4||0||1.5||.333||.000||–||0.0||0.3||0.0||0.0||0.5
|-
|style="text-align:left;"|2004
|style="text-align:left;”|Boston
|1||0||1.0||.000||–||–||0.0||0.0||0.0||0.0||0.0
|- class="sortbottom"
| style="text-align:center;" colspan="2"| Career
| 31 || 0 || 8.5 || .510 || .436 ||.750 || 0.7 || 0.8 || 0.4 || 0.0 || 4.3

References

External links
 
Bio at NBA.com
Dana Barros Sports Complex

1967 births
Living people
American men's basketball players
American people of Cape Verdean descent
Basketball coaches from Massachusetts
Basketball players from Massachusetts
Boston Celtics assistant coaches
Boston Celtics players
Boston College Eagles men's basketball players
Detroit Pistons players
National Basketball Association All-Stars
People from Westwood, Massachusetts
Philadelphia 76ers players
Point guards
Seattle SuperSonics draft picks
Seattle SuperSonics players
Shooting guards
Sportspeople from Boston
Xaverian Brothers High School alumni